Caladenia startiorum, commonly known as Starts' spider orchid, is a species of orchid endemic to the south-west of Western Australia. It has a single erect, hairy leaf and up to three pink flowers with a fringe of long teeth on the sides of the labellum and pinkish to brown club-like glandular tips on the sepals.

Description 
The sepals and petals have thick pinkish to brown glandular tips. Flowering occurs from September to October, more prolifically after summer fires.

Taxonomy and naming 
Caladenia startiorum was first formally described in 2001 by Stephen Hopper and Andrew Phillip Brown from a specimen collected near the northern edge of the Mount Lindesay National Park and the description was published in Nuytsia. The specific epithet (startiorum) honours the Start family for their interest in Australian orchids and for discovering this species.

Distribution and habitat 
Starts' spider orchid is found between Mount Barker and the Porongurup National Park in the Jarrah Forest biogeographic regions where it grows in moist heath and nearby woodland and in dense shrubby forest.

Conservation
Caladenia startiorum is classified as "Priority Two" by the Western Australian Government Department of Parks and Wildlife meaning that it is poorly known and from only one or a few locations.

References 

startiorum
Endemic orchids of Australia
Orchids of Western Australia
Plants described in 2001
Endemic flora of Western Australia
Taxa named by Stephen Hopper
Taxa named by Andrew Phillip Brown